Hirate is a Japanese surname. Notable people with the surname include:

, Japanese samurai
, Japanese racing driver
, Japanese samurai
, Japanese speed skater
, Japanese singer and idol

Japanese-language surnames